Nicholas Wilson (born 6 August 1990) is a New Zealand field hockey player who plays at striker. He currently plays for New Zealand's Hockey National Team, the Black Stick men's team.

Career
He attended Palmerston North Intermediate Normal School and then on to Palmerston North Boys' High School, where he represented their first eleven team from 2005 to 2007. Wilson spent his final year at Westlake Boys High School in Auckland.

Wilson made his first appearance for 'The Black Sticks' against Korea in New Zealand in November 2007 at the age of 17. He scored his first goal against the number one (at the time) Australian team at Sydney Olympic Park. Known for his attacking style of play, he was touted as one of New Zealand's next field hockey stars.

In 2010, Wilson became the first New Zealander to be nominated for the International Hockey Federation's (FIH) Young Player of the Year award. He was also named in the FIH All Stars team of players who "lit up the hockey world over the past year".

He played for New Zealand at the 2010 Commonwealth Games, winning a bronze medal.  He also played for New Zealand at the 2012 and 2016 Summer Olympics.

References

External links

1990 births
Living people
New Zealand male field hockey players
Male field hockey forwards
Olympic field hockey players of New Zealand
Field hockey players at the 2012 Summer Olympics
Field hockey players at the 2016 Summer Olympics
Field hockey players at the 2020 Summer Olympics
Commonwealth Games bronze medallists for New Zealand
Commonwealth Games medallists in field hockey
Field hockey players at the 2010 Commonwealth Games
People educated at Palmerston North Boys' High School
Hockey India League players
HC Rotterdam players
2010 Men's Hockey World Cup players
Medallists at the 2010 Commonwealth Games